Margherita Taylor  (born 26 April 1972) is an English TV and radio presenter. She is a freelancer with Global Group and currently presents on stations Smooth Radio and Classic FM.

Taylor studied media and communications at the University of Central England (now Birmingham City University), majoring in video production for her degree.

Radio
Taylor is of British, Trinidadian, Ghanaian and Danish heritage. Taylor started her career in broadcasting in 1993 when Birmingham based radio station BRMB offered her a slot as a DJ as part of a talent contest. She presented a weekend overnight show, but soon came to the attention of bosses at Capital London, BRMB's former sister station in London, and in 1994, was appointed presenter of weekend breakfast on the station, and provided cover for Capital's other presenters. She was the longest serving member of the on-air team.

Taylor has presented an evening show on The Jazz; a radio station available on satellite, DAB and online. She could be heard on the Capital nine-station network presenting early weekend breakfast from 8 January until 31 December 2011.

Presently, Taylor presents on two Global Group radio stations: Smooth Classics on Classic FM each weeknight 2200–0100, along with Sunday afternoons from 1200–1600 and regular supply cover on Heart London and The Heart Network until March 2017. In March 2017 Taylor moved to Smooth London to present Sunday afternoons 2–6pm show, which is part of the Global Group

Taylor was appointed Member of the Order of the British Empire (MBE) in the 2022 New Year Honours for services to broadcasting and diversity.

Television
In March 1999, Taylor became one of the original presenters of the Channel 4 daytime teen-aimed show, T4, alongside Dermot O'Leary and later Vernon Kay. She left in January 2002.

She has acted as a contributor for Good Morning Britain, Lorraine, Countryfile, and This Morning on ITV, presenting competitions.

She began presenting Escape to the Country in 2016 on BBC One and has presented on Countryfile.

Taylor has also done voiceover work for British television advertisements.

References

External links
 Margherita Taylor
 Smooth Classics on Classic FM
 Margherita Taylor on Smooth Radio

Alumni of Birmingham City University
English radio personalities
English radio DJs
English television presenters
Classical music radio presenters
Heart (radio network)
Living people
Black British television personalities
1972 births
English people of Danish descent
English people of Trinidad and Tobago descent
Members of the Order of the British Empire